Adolph William "Al" Schwimmer (‎ 10 June 1917 – 10 June 2011) was an American and later Israeli engineer and businessman. He was the founder and first CEO of Israel Aerospace Industries.

Early life 
In 1917, Schwimmer was born in New York City, New York, the son of immigrants from Eastern Europe. Schwimmer never used his given birth name of Adolph, preferring the nickname "Al".

Career 
In 1939, Schwimmer began his aerospace career at Lockheed Corporation as an engineer and also received his civilian pilot license. During World War II, he worked for TWA and assisted the U.S. Air Transport Command as a flight engineer.

During the 1948 Arab–Israeli War, Schwimmer used his World War II experience and his contacts to smuggle surplus war planes to Israel. Schwimmer reflected on what motivated these actions in an interview with Boaz Dvir. The alternative was described as a "Second Holocaust [...] they believed that those 600,000 Jews were going to die." Using circuitous routes, he also recruited the pilots and crews to fly the planes to Israel. Many of these men became the nucleus of the Israeli Air Force.

In 1949, Schwimmer returned to the United States and, in 1950, he was convicted in the United States of violating the US Neutrality Acts for smuggling the planes into Israel. Schwimmer was stripped of his voting rights and veteran benefits and fined $10,000, but did not receive a prison sentence. Schwimmer refused to ask for a pardon, believing that smuggling weapons to help create Israel was the right moral decision to make. In 2001, President Bill Clinton gave Schwimmer a presidential pardon.

In the early 1950s, Schwimmer, who was running an aircraft maintenance company in Burbank, California, was approached by David Ben-Gurion, Israel's then prime minister, who asked Schwimmer to return to Israel and establish an aircraft company for commercial and military purposes. Schwimmer acceded to Ben Gurion's request and founded Israel Aerospace Industries, of which he became the first CEO.

Schwimmer was one of the founders of Savyon, but later moved to Tel Aviv.

In the mid-1980s, Schwimmer was a special adviser for technology and industry for Israel's then-Prime Minister Shimon Peres, who became a close friend.

Personal life 
Schwimmer was married and had two children, Danny and Dafna, as well as four grandchildren, Orr, Ella, Sarah, and Avi. On June 10, 2011, Schwimmer died on his 94th birthday in a hospital in Ramat Gan, Tel Aviv District, Israel.

In popular culture 
In 2015, his exploits during 1948 Arab–Israeli War were depicted in the PBS documentary A Wing and a Prayer, written, directed, and produced by Boaz Dvir. The film contains the only public interview Schwimmer gave in light of these events.

Awards
 In 2006, Schwimmer was awarded the Israel Prize, for his lifetime achievement and special contribution to society and the State.
In 2018, Schwimmer was posthumously honored by the Embassy of Israel in Washington, D.C., as one of the 70 most valuable American contributors to the strengthening of Israel and its alliance with the United States.

See also
 List of Israel Prize recipients
 List of people pardoned by Bill Clinton

References

External links 
 .
 .
 Al Schwimmer at LATimes.com
 Al Schwimmer's Presidential Pardon at israellobby.org
 Al Schwimmer at Forbes.com
 Clinton pardons listed at justice.gov

1917 births
2011 deaths
20th-century American businesspeople
21st-century American businesspeople
Aircraft designers
American aerospace businesspeople
American aerospace designers
American aerospace engineers
American aviation businesspeople
American consulting businesspeople
American emigrants to Israel
20th-century American Jews
American manufacturing businesspeople
Businesspeople from New York (state)
Israeli aerospace engineers
Israeli Air Force personnel
Israeli chief executives
Israeli Jews
Israel Prize for special contribution to society and the State recipients
Jewish engineers
Lockheed people
People from Ramat Gan
Recipients of American presidential pardons
Trans World Airlines people
21st-century American Jews